Thomas Hitschler (born 27 June 1982) is a German politician of the Social Democratic Party (SPD) who has been serving as Parliamentary State Secretary in the  Federal Ministry of Defence in the coalition government of Chancellor Olaf Scholz since 2021. He has been serving as a member of the Bundestag from the state of Rhineland-Palatinate since 2013.

Political career 
Hitschler became member of the Bundestag in the 2013 German federal election, representing the Südpfalz district. From 2014 until 2021, he was part of the Defence Committee, where he served as his parliamentary group's rapporteur on the infrastructure of the Bundeswehr. From 2018 until 2021, he has also a member of the Committee on Home Affairs. In 2020 he joined the Parliamentary Oversight Panel (PKGr), which provides parliamentary oversight of Germany’s intelligence services BND, BfV and MAD.

In the negotiations to form a coalition government under the leadership of Chancellor Angela Merkel following the 2017 federal elections, Hitschler was part of the working group on foreign policy, led by Ursula von der Leyen, Gerd Müller and Sigmar Gabriel. 

In addition to his committee assignments, Hitschler has been a member of the German delegation to the Franco-German Parliamentary Assembly since 2019.

For the 2021 elections, Hitschler was elected to lead the SPD campaign in Rhineland-Palatinate. In the negotiations to form a so-called traffic light coalition of the SPD, the Green Party and the Free Democrats (FDP) following the elections, he was part of his party's delegation in the working group on homeland security, civil rights and consumer protection, co-chaired by Christine Lambrecht, Konstantin von Notz and Wolfgang Kubicki.

Other activities 
 German United Services Trade Union (ver.di), Member
 1. FC Kaiserslautern, Member

References

External links 

  
 Bundestag biography 

1982 births
Living people
Members of the Bundestag for Rhineland-Palatinate
Members of the Bundestag 2021–2025
Members of the Bundestag 2017–2021
Members of the Bundestag 2013–2017
Members of the Bundestag for the Social Democratic Party of Germany